The 2021 IHF World Men's Handball Championship was the 27th event hosted by the International Handball Federation and held in Egypt from 13 to 31 January 2021.

Starting with this edition, the World Championship was expanded from 24 teams to 32. It was also the third World Championship hosted in Africa, the second in Egypt, and the first to be hosted outside of Europe since 2015.

Denmark were the defending champions, having won their first World Championship title in 2019 on home soil. They defended the title by beating Sweden in the final, the second final between two Scandinavian countries in a row. On the way, Denmark defeated hosts Egypt in the quarter-finals, and the reigning European champions Spain in the semi-finals. The latter secured the bronze medal after defeating France in the third place game.

The tournament was played behind closed doors due to the COVID-19 pandemic.

Bidding process 
Seven nations initially expressed interest in hosting the tournament:

However, until the bidding phase expired on 15 April 2015, only three nations entered documents to bid for the event:

A decision was scheduled for 4 June 2015, but the Congress was moved to 6 November 2015, where Egypt was chosen as the host.

Format 
The 2021 edition saw a format change as the tournament was expanded. The 32 teams were split into eight groups of four teams each. The top three teams from each group progressed to the main round, while the teams ranked last in their preliminary round groups played the President's Cup. The 24 main round teams were divided into four groups of six teams each. The top two teams from each group advanced to the quarter-finals.

Venues 
Following is a list of all venues and host cities.

Qualification 
As is the previous edition, the World Championship organizer was directly qualified, along with the reigning world champions.
Following the decision about increasing the number of participating teams, changes were made in the distribution of places by the Continental Confederations. The number of compulsory places awarded to each Continental Confederation was increased as follows: four places each for Africa, Asia, and Europe.
Starting from this tournament, Pan America was split into two zones: the North America and Caribbean Zone with one compulsory place, and the South and Central America Zone with three places. There was also a South and Central American Men's Last Chance Qualification Tournament which provided a qualification spot for the winning team.
One additional place was available for Oceania, but only in the case where that national team would rank fifth or higher at the Asian Championship. Since no Oceania team placed among the top five at the Asian Championship, the IHF awarded an additional wild card.
In addition, there were 12 performance places for the Continental Confederations, which were based on the teams ranked 1–12 of the preceding World Championship.
According to the new qualification system and taking into consideration the results of the 2019 Men's World Championship, 32 places were distributed as follows:

Host nation: 1
Reigning world champion: 1
Africa: 6
Asia: 4
Europe: 13
Pan America: 5
North America and Caribbean: 1
South and Central America: 3
 South and Central American Last Chance Qualification Tournament: 1
Oceania/additional wild card: 1
Wild card: 1

1. Since countries from Oceania (Australia or New Zealand) participating in the Asian Championships did not finish within the top five, they did not qualify for the World Championship. Since they placed sixth or lower, the place transferred to the wild card spot.
2. Due to the COVID-19 pandemic, the South and North American qualification tournaments were scrapped. The IHF Council decided to extend the deadline for the organisation of the remaining qualification tournaments until 31 October 2020.
3. Because the European qualification was cancelled, the final ranking of the 2020 European Men's Handball Championship was used to determine the participants.
4. On 9 December 2019, the World Anti-Doping Agency (WADA) banned Russia from all international sport for a period of four years, after the Russian government was found to have tampered with laboratory data that it provided to WADA in January 2019 as a condition of the Russian Anti-Doping Agency being reinstated. As a result of the ban, WADA plans to allow individually cleared Russian athletes to take part in the 2020 Summer Olympics under a neutral banner, as instigated at the 2018 Winter Olympics, but they will not be permitted to compete in team sports. The title of the neutral banner has yet to be determined; WADA Compliance Review Committee head Jonathan Taylor stated that the IOC would not be able to use "Olympic Athletes from Russia" (OAR) as it did in 2018, emphasizing that neutral athletes cannot be portrayed as representing a specific country. Russia later filed an appeal to the Court of Arbitration for Sport (CAS) against the WADA decision. After reviewing the case on appeal, CAS ruled on 17 December 2020 to reduce the penalty that WADA had placed on Russia. Instead of banning Russia from sporting events, the ruling allowed Russia to participate at the Olympics and other international events, but for a period of two years, the team cannot use the Russian name, flag, or anthem and must present themselves as "Neutral Athlete" or "Neutral Team". The ruling does allow for team uniforms to display "Russia" on the uniform as well as the use of the Russian flag colors within the uniform's design, although the name should be up to equal predominance as the "Neutral Athlete/Team" designation. The Russian team will play under the name "Russian Handball Federation Team".

Qualified teams 

1 Bold indicates champion for that year.
2 Italic indicates host country for that year.
3 Participated as a Unified Korea team in 2019.
4 On 12 January, the International Handball Federation announced that the Czech Republic had withdrawn from the tournament due to high number of COVID-19 infected players. North Macedonia replaced them.
<div id="5">5 Participated as Russia in 1993–2019.
6 On 12 January, the International Handball Federation announced that the United States had withdrawn from the tournament due to high number of COVID-19 infected players. Switzerland replaced them.
7 From both German teams only East Germany was qualified in 1990

Draw 
The draw was held on 5 September 2020 at the Giza Pyramids Plateau. As hosts, Egypt had the privilege to assign itself to a group.

Seeding 
On 23 July 2020, the pots were announced.

Groups 
This is the result of the draw with all groups

Referees 
The referee pairs were selected on 4 January 2021.

Squads

Preliminary round 
All times are local (UTC+2).

Group A

Group B

Group C

Group D

Group E

Group F

Group G

Group H

Presidents Cup

Group I

Group II

31st place game

29th place game

27th place game

25th place game

Main round 
All points obtained in the preliminary round against teams that advance as well, are carried over.

Group I

Group II

Group III

Group IV

Final round

Bracket

Quarterfinals

Semifinals

Third place game

Final

Final ranking and awards

Final ranking 
Places 1 to 4 and 25 to 32 were decided by play-off or knock-out. The losers of the quarter finals were ranked 5th to 8th according to the places in the main round, points gained and goal difference. Teams finishing third in the main round were ranked 9th to 12th, teams finishing fourth in the main round were ranked 13th to 16th, teams finishing fifth in the main round were ranked 17th to 20th and teams ranked sixth were ranked 21st to 24th. In case of a tie in points gained, the goal difference of the main round were taken into account, then number of goals scored. If teams would still be equal, number of points gained in the preliminary round would be considered followed by the goal difference and then number of goals scored in the preliminary round.

All-star Team 
The All-star Team was announced on 31 January 2021.

Statistics

Top goalscorers

Top goalkeepers

Broadcasters 

Source:

Notes

References

External links 

IHF website

2021 Men
World Men's Handball Championship
World Men's Handball Championship
2021 World Men's Handball Championship
International handball competitions hosted by Egypt
January 2021 sports events in Africa